Igor Yakovlevich Birman (July 25, 1928 – April 6, 2011) was a Russian-American economist. Received his Ph.D. in 1960. Authored a number of books translated into four languages and some 200 articles in professional periodicals and also in the popular press (Izvestia, Literaturnaya gazeta, Wall Street Journal, Washington Post).

Biography
Birman was born in Moscow in 1928, graduated from the Statistical Institute in 1949, Ph.D. in Economics (кандидат экономических наук) - 1960. Was Director of Planning in three factories, worked in scientific institutes. Member of the commission on the economic reform (1965). 
 
In 1974 Birman emigrated to the United States, where was employed chiefly as a consultant on the Soviet economy for The Pentagon and taught at two universities. He argued against economic estimates made by the CIA and Sovietologists, particularly, the size of the economy, comparative level of living, share and size of military expenditures, deficit of the state budget, etc. Together with Valery Chalidze he edited the magazine «Russia».

Birman is best known for having criticized U.S. economists specializing in the Soviet Union (sovietologists) and CIA analysts for overestimating the size of the Soviet economy. On October 27, 1980, Birman published a piece in the Washington Post stating that the CIAʼs current picture of the Soviet economy was far too optimistic.  "The Soviet economy was in a state of 'crisis,' Birman declared, while Russian living standards were 'a fourth or even a fifth the American level.' …Outside critics had often attacked the CIAʼs operational side but never its analysis, and certainly not from the political Right. …… In 1986, the CIAʼs analysts insisted that the Soviet economy was about to expand… Three years later, the Soviet Union collapsed."

At the crux of the issue is how U.S. specialists estimated the size of the Soviet economy and the amount of resources it devoted to military expenditures. Up until 1975 the CIA estimated that the Soviet GDP was about 50% of that of the U.S., and that Soviets spend about 6% of the GDP, same as the U.S., on military expenditures. However, Birman argued that the size of the Soviet economy was more like 1/5 of U.S. economy; and to keep up with U.S. military expenditures, Soviets had to invest such a large percentage of their GNP (as much as 30%) that if such spending were sustained Soviet economy would collapse. He criticized American economists for misunderstanding Soviet life, and the power wielded by the Soviet leaders to devote such resources to the military.

"At the base … lies a lack of understanding of a simple fact – the share of Soviet GNP allocated for military purposes is extraordinarily high. For Western observer… it is almost impossible to imagine what the Soviet rulers set aside for war preparations. Precisely this enabled them to have tremendous military strength with a weak economy. This misunderstanding, the root of which is transferring Western impressions to Soviet reality, is the basis of [overestimating]; CIA economists believing in a modest share of military expenditures unavoidably had to believe also in the very big overall size of the Soviet economy."

As a result of such massive investment of their economy in the military, Birman expected that the Soviet economy would collapse, and with it the Soviet Union, as in this 1981 article:

"A great specialist on Soviet history [Richard Pipes] wrote to me recently that, while agreeing with my economic analysis, he 'simply cannot think of a case of a country collapsing politically because of a slowdown in the rate of economic growth.'  I admire him very much, but allow myself to ask – why not?  Indeed, the Soviet case is not just some slowdown. The core of my analysis is that the slowdown will continue and the economy will experience negative growth…  Once again-as an economist I risk drawing only economic conclusions. But historians and political scientists should address the most urgent question-what can happen to the Soviet regime under negative economic growth?"

With the opening up of the Soviet Union and its records, Birman's assertions were supported by Soviet economists themselves, as in these 1990 reports:

"Several senior Soviet economists said here today that the United States had consistently overestimated the size of the Soviet economy and understated Soviet military spending……American officials said the data offered by the Soviet economists helped explain why the burden of military spending was becoming unbearable for the Soviets and why Moscow had been willing to make concessions in recent arms control talks."

"Rather than disputing the iconoclastic Mr. Birman's findings, Yuri Dikhanov of the Soviet Academy of Sciences has gone to heroic technical efforts to confirm them. In a tortuous extrapolation using the Hungarian economy as a benchmark, he estimates that Soviet consumption per person averaged just 20 percent that of Americans' in 1985."
 
American academics were skeptical of his assertions, and his work was not published in the major journals:

"With the information now coming of the Soviet Union, [Birman's] evaluation of Soviet economic conditions surely looks increasingly plausible.  Yet, with the exception of some British journals, Birman seems to have encountered substantial resistance to the dissemination and discussion of his views…. To my knowledge his statement, made in 1986, that he has not managed to express his views in the American sovietological literature remains largely true…. Despite his fundamental disagreements with the sovietological community, it seemed impossible for him to engage those with whom he disagreed in scholarly discussions and ..his writings were rarely referred to in the literature."

Birman was criticized for not relying on Western economic theory in conducting his analyses of Soviet economy:

"I … deviate from the mainstream of economics, largely because of my disagreement with the view that economic theories are universal and hence applicable to any (type of) economy. ……. In my immodest opinion, the attempt to formulate a 'scientifically correct' course for the economies in transition was doomed from the start precisely because the course prescribed certain 'universal recipes' for all of them."

And he did not trust mathematical models:

".. there are many things in economics which cannot be expressed in numbers, that numbers are always deceiving. …. I am not saying that economic figures always and everywhere are useless. Quite the contrary, I have spent my life struggling to pin down numbers. But I do not trust numbers themselves: I check numbers with facts, with logic, with other numbers. We should not pray to numbers as to icons."

Instead, he advocated for including data from what he called "anecdotal economics," relying in part on his visceral understanding of the Soviet Union, lived experience, and intuition that could not be quantified or modeled:

"before taking seriously the results of calculations with models, we should first look at the data used. Unfortunately models are often much better than data. On the other hand, ideas and assertions should not be dismissed because they are not supported by models. Having lived in that country for 45 years, and having studied its economy from outside for another 11, I trust my intuition no less than models. I am not saying that all models are bad, or should not be used, but I suggest that reasoning, simple logic, and the like, which are called anecdotal economics must not be dismissed."

In the end, his predictions turned out to be correct:

"Given what has happened and what we now know, Birman clearly did get it right. ….. some of the most 'advanced' techniques were used in studies of the Soviet economy….. But these techniques clearly did not perform as well as Birman's 'anecdotal economics' in getting the Soviet economic situation right. …..Yet if the process of scholarship is to avoid being a self-perpetuating and closed system of review and citation, which.. Birman encountered, there has to be a better arbiter than the refereed, scholarly journal. I would call it the reality test."

Books by Igor Birman
 Транспортная задача линейного программирования. М.: Экономиздат, 1959
 Оптимальное программирование, М.: Экономика, 1968 / нем. издание: Lineare Optimierung in der Okonomie. Berlin: Verlag Die Wirtschaft, 1971
 Методология оптимального планирования. М.: Мысль, 1971 /in Czech. Прага: 1974/
 Secret Incomes of the Soviet State Budget. The Hague ; Boston : Martinus Nijhoff, 1981. ;  0908094086;  0908094000 (bibliography pp. 270–272)
 Экономика недостач. Нью-Йорк: Chalidze publications, 1983.
 To Build Anew (рус.: Строить заново). Benson, Vermont : Chalidze Publ., 1988 
 Personal Consumption in the USSR and USA. N.Y. : St. Martin Press, 1989.  (Библиография: стр.191-251)
 Productivity of the Soviet Economy Before Perestroika. Dump Eurospan, 1991. 
 Величина советских военных расходов: методический аспект. Стокгольм: : Inst., 1991
 Реформа экономики абсурда: к собственной собственности. М.: Пик, 1991
 Я — экономист (о себе любимом). Новосибирск: Экор, 1966; (2-е издание - М.: Время, 2001).
 Уровень русской жизни (а также американской) (The level of Russian living and American as well).М.:Научный мир, 2004 (2-е изд. — М.: Экономика, 2007),
 Капиталистический манифест (Capitalist manifesto). M.: 2010

and co-authored and edited several books, for example:
Notes on input-output analysis in the USSR. (в соавт. с Альбиной Третьяковой) Durham, N. C., 1975
 Статистика уровня жизни населения России (в соавторстве с Л.Пияшевой). М.:1997;
 Математические методы и проблемы размещения производства (Mathematical methods and problems of production territorial allocation). М.: Изд-во эконом. лит-ры, 1963;
 Оптимальный план отрасли (Optimal Plan of a Branch) M.: Ekonomizdat, 1970; etc.

Selected articles
 
 Birman, I. (1980; October 27).  The Way to Slow the Arms Race.  Washington Post, Op-Ed, P. A15
 
 Birman, I. (1986). The Soviet Economy: Alternative Views, Russia, 12
 
 
 
 Аномальное полузнайство.- В: Свободная мысль. М.: 1997 сентябрь
 Письмо в редакцию (по поводу статьи Тремля и Кудрова). - В: Вопросы статитики. М.: 1998, No. 4.
 Уровень русской жизни (недопроизнесенный доклад). - В: Nota Bene, Иерусалим: 2006, No. 13.
 Избытчность - норма нормальной экономики. - В: Экономическая наука современной России. М.; 2007, No. 4.

Literature about Birman

References

1928 births
2011 deaths
Soviet emigrants to the United States
American economists
Soviet economists